Hal Colston is an American Democratic politician who represented Chittenden-6-7 district in the Vermont House of Representatives from 2019 until 2023. He retired from the house before the 2022 Vermont House of Representatives election.

References 

Living people
21st-century American politicians
Democratic Party members of the Vermont House of Representatives
Year of birth missing (living people)